Jeremiah "Tommy" Ryan (12 August 1873 – 29 August 1948) was an Australian rules footballer who played for the Melbourne Football Club and St Kilda Football Club in the Victorian Football League (VFL).

Ryan, a rover and forward, came to Melbourne from Richmond City. He had spent 1893, 1895 and 1896 playing in the Victorian Football Association (VFA) for both Carlton and Richmond.

On his VFL debut, Ryan kicked five goals as Melbourne defeated St Kilda by 93 points at the MCG. He was the club's leading goal-kicker in their premiership year of 1900 with 24 goals, one of those in the 1900 VFL Grand Final which he played from a forward pocket.

References

Holmesby, Russell and Main, Jim (2007). The Encyclopedia of AFL Footballers. 7th ed. Melbourne: Bas Publishing.

External links

Demonwiki profile
Blueseum profile

1873 births
1948 deaths
Australian rules footballers from Victoria (Australia)
Australian Rules footballers: place kick exponents
Richmond Football Club (VFA) players
Melbourne Football Club players
St Kilda Football Club players
Melbourne Football Club Premiership players
One-time VFL/AFL Premiership players